The 1989–90 season was the 75th season of the Isthmian League, which is an English football competition featuring semi-professional and amateur clubs from London, East and South East England. 

The league consisted of three divisions. Division Two was divided into two sections.

Slough Town were champions, winning their second Isthmian League title and were promoted to the Conference.

Premier Division

The Premier Division consisted of 22 clubs, including 19 clubs from the previous season and three new clubs:
 Aylesbury United, relegated from the Football Conference
 Basingstoke Town, promoted as runners-up in Division One
 Staines Town, promoted as champions of Division One

League table

Division One

Division One consisted of 22 clubs, including 16 clubs from the previous season and six new clubs:

Two clubs relegated from the Premier Division:
 Croydon
 Tooting & Mitcham United

Two clubs promoted from Division Two North:
 Harlow Town
 Purfleet

Two clubs promoted from Division Two South:
 Dorking
 Whyteleafe

League table

Division Two North

Division Two North consisted of 22 clubs, including 19 clubs from the previous season and three new clubs:

 Basildon United, relegated from Division One
 Collier Row, relegated from Division One
 Finchley, transferred from Division Two South

League table

Division Two South

Division Two South consisted of 21 clubs, including 18 clubs from the previous season and three new clubs:

 Abingdon Town, joined from the Spartan League
 Bracknell Town, relegated from Division One
 Malden Vale, promoted from the Combined Counties League

League table

See also
Isthmian League
1989–90 Northern Premier League
1989–90 Southern Football League

References

Isthmian League seasons
6